U is a possible astronomical body detected by Chile's Atacama Large Millimeter Array (ALMA) during a survey for substellar objects in the Alpha Centauri system.

Based on its proper motion, it was at first thought to be a part of the Alpha Centauri system. Further analysis, however, found that the object must be closer to the Solar System, and that it may be gravitationally bound to the Sun. Maybe it can be Planet Nine.

The research was published on the arXiv in December 2015, but was later withdrawn pending further study. Additional observations of the detection at 343.5 GHz could not be made, whereas the detection at 445 GHz was confirmed to greater than 12σ. A single point of data, however, is insufficient for proper analysis, and further observations must be made to better determine this object's nature and its orbit.

Other astronomers have expressed skepticism over this claim. Mike Brown thinks that it is statistically improbable for a new Solar System object to be accidentally observed in ALMA's extremely narrow field of view, whereas Bruce Macintosh suggests that the detections may be artifacts introduced due to ALMA's calibration methods.

References 

Astronomical objects discovered in 2015
Scattered disc and detached objects
Possible dwarf planets